"The Innocent Sleep" is an American television play broadcast live on June 5, 1958, as part of the second season of the CBS television series Playhouse 90. Tad Mosel wrote the teleplay, and Franklin Schaffner directed. Hope Lange, John Ericson, and Buster Keaton starred, and Raymond Burr was the host.

Plot
Alex Winter is the young bride of a wealthy elderly man, Clyde Winter. She marries the elderly man after the breakup of her relationship with Leo West who later returns to woo her. The man's longtime housekeeper, Mrs. Downey, is suspicious of Alex's motives. The play concerns "patterns of guilt among the characters."

Cast
The following performers received screen credit for their performances:

 Hope Lange - Alex Winter
 John Ericson - Leo West
 Buster Keaton - Charles Blackburn
 Hope Emerson - Mrs. Downey
 Dennis King - Clyde Winter
 Peg Hillias - Mrs. Mowle

Raymond Burr was the host and Dick Joyce the announcer.

Production
Martin Manulis was the producer, and Franklin Schaffner directed. Tad Mosel wrote the teleplay, a project he had been working on for three years. The production was broadcast on June 5, 1958. It was part of the second season of Playhouse 90, an anthology television series that was voted "the greatest television series of all time" in a 1970 poll of television editors.

The program's commercial sponsors were the American Gas Association, Ipana toothpaste, Allstate insurance, Camel cigarettes, and Kleenex.

References

1958 television plays
1958 American television episodes
Playhouse 90 (season 2) episodes